The Dynamo Charities Cup is an annual friendly match putting the Houston Dynamo against an international opponent, with a portion of the match’s proceeds donated to charity.

Format
Each team will face each other only once at the host team's venue. A max of 10 substitutions are allowed; re-entry is not allowed unless a goalkeeper injury is sustained. If the match is tied after 90 minutes, a penalty shootout will be implemented.

Venue
Only one city has served as the venue of the Dynamo Charities Cup. The Dynamo began play in their new stadium in May of the 2012 season.

Charities Cup matches

Key

Results 

 1 - Won the Liga MX Apertura 2009 & Apertura 2010
 2 – Won the Copa MX Apertura 2014, Liga MX Clausura 2015 & Campeón de Campeones 2014-15

Kickoff times are in CDT.

2009: vs. Monterrey

2010: vs. Águila

2011: vs. Bolton (Trans-Atlantic Challenge)

2012: vs. Valencia (BBVA Compass Cup)

2013: vs. Stoke City (BBVA Compass Cup)

2014: vs. Aston Villa F.C (BBVA Compass Cup)

2015: vs. Santos Laguna

2016: vs. Real Sociedad

2017: vs. Cruz Azul

2018: vs. Monterrey

References

External links
Dynamo Charities Cup

Soccer cup competitions in the United States
Houston Dynamo FC
2009 establishments in Texas